So Glad I'm Me is LaKisha Jones' debut album, which was released on May 19, 2009. The first single entitled "So Glad I'm Me" was released to iTunes in November 2008.

A Fan Book, signed by fans on her Myspace was released with the CD. Bonus Tracks and additional footage is available in stores such as Walmart. The album has sold more than 4,000 copies.

Track listing
 "Grateful"
 "So Glad I'm Me"
 "Beautiful Girl"
 "Same Song"
 "Let's Go Celebrate"
 "Ain't Worth It"
 "Nothing"
 "Be Alright"
 "You Give Good Love"
 "Free" (feat. Mike Winans)
 "Memories (Fade Away)"
 "Just As I Am"

Bonus tracks
 "Bye Bye" - Walmart Bonus Track
 "So Glad I'm Me" (Black Pearl Club Mix) - Walmart Bonus Track, iTunes Bonus Track
 "Picked the Right Time" - Target Bonus Track
 "Let's Go Celebrate (Remix)"- Target Bonus Track
 "Let's Go Celebrate" (Jody Den Broeder Remix) - iTunes Bonus Track
 "Let's Go Celebrate" (Friscia and Lamboy Remix) - iTunes Bonus Track

References

2009 debut albums
LaKisha Jones albums